Marble Beach State Recreation Area is a  state recreation area in Dickinson County, Iowa, United States, near the city of Orleans. The recreation area is located on the western shore of Big Spirit Lake and is one of several state parks and recreation areas in Iowa Great Lakes region. It is home to the largest state-owned campground in the region and one of the state's most popular, which includes electric and non-electric campsites and modern facilities. The park also includes a boat ramp onto the lake and fishing areas.

The area was named Marble Beach in 1944, shortly after it was acquired by the Iowa Department of Natural Resources. The name honored one of the families killed in the Spirit Lake Massacre.

References

State parks of Iowa
Protected areas of Dickinson County, Iowa